"I scream" is a line from the popular novelty song "Ice Cream (I Scream, You Scream, We All Scream for Ice Cream)". It may also refer to:

Arts, entertainment, and music
 I Scream (album), a 2006 album by Nana Kitade
 I Scream (EP), a 1993 EP by Some Velvet Sidewalk
 iScream, a digital service launched by the British horror film magazine Scream
 "iScream on Halloween", an episode from the first season of the American television series iCarly
 I Scream Party, a 2007 EP by Sug
 I Scream Records, a record label based in Belgium
 iScreaM Vol. 1-12, remix projects by South Korean label ScreaM Records
 Iscream, a cute evil rabbit in the Chikn Nuggit series

See also
 Ice cream
 Ice cream (disambiguation)
 Scream (disambiguation)